Kaynardzha Airfield  is a public use airport located 2 nm southwest of Kaynardzha, Silistra, Bulgaria.

See also
List of airports in Bulgaria

References

External links 
 Airport record for Kaynardzha Airfield at Landings.com

Airports in Bulgaria
Silistra Province